Frederick de Troys or Trogisio was a councillor of King Robert of Naples, who served as bailli of the Principality of Achaea from July 1318 until 1321. 

His appointment marks the start of a series of foreign governors being appointed over the Principality. His tenure was troubled, both domestically, as Angevin control over the Principality was contested, as well as due to the threat posed by the Catalan Company, that had recently conquered the neighbouring Duchy of Athens. Most notably, the same period saw the expansion of the Byzantine province of Mystras: the bailli and his army were heavily defeated at the Battle of Saint George in September 1320 by the Byzantine sunder Andronikos Asen, leaving the centrally located province of Arcadia in Byzantine hands.

References

Sources
 
 

14th-century French people
Baillis of the Principality of Achaea
People of the Kingdom of Naples
14th-century people from the Principality of Achaea